The Liga de Baloncesto Puertorriqueña (LBP) is the second tier of professional basketball in Puerto Rico. It is a FIBA-sanctioned league, founded by the Puerto Rican Basketball Federation. The current champions are the Maratonistas de Coamo.

History 
Founded in 1984 as “La Liga del Pueblo”, the second-tier league in Puerto Rico was intended as a place to develop local players who would represent their communities with pride. There was originally an age limit of 20–30. The success of the Baloncesto Superior Nacional in the 1980s prompted this demand.  Soon the league would spread from coast-to-coast and include up to 48 teams, garnering a TV deal with Northstar Communications, and leaguewide sponsorships from Toyota and Popular, Inc.

Current Teams 
For the 2021–2022 season which begins 12/1/2021, there are 44 teams. These teams are grouped into four divisions, Norte (North), Este (East), Sur (South), and Oeste (West). Many reflect the first-tier clubs that share the city; i.e. Cariduros de Fajardo being the designation for both the Baloncesto Superior Nacional team and the LBP team.

References

External links 
 Official statistics and standings
 LigaLBPOficial

United S
 
 
Puerto Rico
Basketball leagues in Puerto Rico